The 1979 Denver Broncos season was the team's 20th year in professional football and its 10th with the National Football League (NFL). Led by third-year head coach Red Miller, the Broncos were 10–6, second in the AFC West, and made the postseason a third consecutive year.

Offseason

NFL draft

Personnel

Staff

Roster

Regular season

Schedule

Game summaries

Week 1

Week 5
 Date: September 30, 1979
 Network: NBC
 Announcers: Dick Enberg and Merlin Olsen
All-Pro Dave Casper returns to Oakland's starting lineup after four weeks as a second stringer, caught a 28-yard touchdown pass from Ken Stabler to open the scoring as the Oakland Raiders upset the Denver Broncos, and ending their three-game losing streak. The Raiders used a two tight end formation throughout most of this game. Casper who reported late to training camp following a contract dispute caught four passes for 92 yards. Casper's final catch of the day was a 42-yard bomb from Stabler which set up one of two Jim Breech field goals in the final period. The Raiders drove 81 yards for their first touchdown late in the first quarter. Denver's Jim Turner made the score 7-3 late in the second period with a 19-yard field goal, but Larry Brunson's 50-yard kickoff return put the Raiders in scoring position and Mark Van Eeghen ran one yard for a touchdown 16 seconds before halftime. The Raiders, 2-3 used a four-man defensive line. It was a switch from their usual three-man front, and Ray Guy of Oakland contribute to the offensive frustrations of 3-2 Denver with some great punting. Guy's last punt pinned the Broncos near their goal line and linebacker Monte Johnson fell on the fumble in the end zone late in the game for the Raiders' final touchdown.

Standings

Playoffs

The Oilers managed to shut down the Broncos offense for most of the game en route to a 13–7 win, holding the Broncos to 216 yards and recording six sacks.

After Toni Fritsch kicked a 31-yard field goal on Houston's first drive, Denver marched 80 yards in 13 plays to score on quarterback Craig Morton's 7-yard touchdown pass to running back Dave Preston. From that point on, the Oilers controlled the rest of the game. With less than 3 minutes left in the first half, Houston advanced 74 yards to score on running back Earl Campbell's 3-yard touchdown run. Although Campbell and starting quarterback Dan Pastorini both missed the second half with injuries, the Oilers defense continued to dominate. In the fourth quarter, a 15-yard interception return by linebacker Gregg Bingham set up Fritsch's 20-yard field goal with 4:18 left in regulation.

References

External links
Denver Broncos – 1979 media guide
1979 Denver Broncos at Pro-Football-Reference.com

Denver Broncos
Denver Broncos seasons
1979 in sports in Colorado